Jacqueline Caurat (23 July 1927 – 22 May 2021) was a French television presenter and journalist.

After a film career during the 1940s and 1950s, Caurat became an in-vision continuity announcer (or speakerine) for the ORTF's first channel.

For 22 years, she presented and co-produced Télé-Philatélie, a series about philately also co-presented by her husband Jacques Mancier. It was during this series that she interviewed high-profile philatelists such as Prince Rainier III of Monaco and stamp designers/engravers.

Filmography

References

External links 

 

1927 births
2021 deaths
French television presenters
French philatelists
Women philatelists
French women journalists
20th-century French journalists
French women television presenters
People from Croydon
20th-century French women